Hend Khaleh (also Romanized as Hend Khāleh; also known as Hendeh Khāleh, Hendūkhāleh, Hind Khāleh, and Khind-Khale) is a village in Hend Khaleh Rural District, Tulem District, Sowme'eh Sara County, Gilan Province, Iran. At the 2006 census, its population was 2,188, in 613 families.

References 

Populated places in Sowme'eh Sara County